Dugspur is an unincorporated community in Carroll County, Virginia, United States. Dugspur has a post office with ZIP code 24325, which opened on August 6, 1850.

References

Unincorporated communities in Carroll County, Virginia
Unincorporated communities in Virginia